Dickson Paul Etuhu (born 8 June 1982) is a Nigerian former professional footballer who played as a defensive midfielder.

He played in the Premier League for Manchester City, Sunderland and Fulham, as well as in the Football League for Preston North End, Norwich City and Blackburn Rovers. He spent the final two years of his career playing in Sweden with AIK and IFK Rössjöholm. He was capped 33 times by Nigeria between 2007 and 2011.

In November 2019 he was found guilty of match fixing by a Swedish court, and said he would appeal. Both Defence and Prosecution said they would appeal the sentence.

Club career

Early career
Etuhu was born in Kano. He signed for Preston North End from Manchester City in January 2002 for £300,000 as David Moyes' side looked to improve from their playoff final defeat to Bolton the season before. He had started just 11 league games for City. Etuhu made his debut in a 0–1 victory at Bradford City and scored his first goal for the club in a 4–2 victory over Sheffield Wednesday a week later. Etuhu became a regular in the Preston side, playing alongside Sean Gregan in centre midfield replacing the injured Mark Rankine. He would go on to score two more goals in the 2001/02 season as Preston ultimately fell short of the playoffs losing manager David Moyes to Everton in March.

Preston began 2002/03 season under the stewardship of new manager Craig Brown and whilst Etuhu was initially first choice in midfield, he soon found himself in and out of the side as Preston struggled to find consistency. Etuhu made 38 appearances in all competitions, adding to his goal tally as Preston finished the season in 12th. Preston's patchy form continued into 2003/04 as their impressive attack was let down by a poor backline despite a number of personnel changes. Etuhu again found himself, along with a number of other Preston players, in and out of the starting eleven as Brown looked to find his best side. Etuhu was reduced to 26 appearances as Preston finished 15th following a poor second half of the season which had seen them in danger of relegation and for the second season running, exit the FA Cup to Third Division opposition as they lost 2–1 to Swansea.

2004/05 saw Preston reach their second playoff final in four years but despite beginning the season in Preston's midfield, Etuhu would only play a bit part in the campaign. Manager Craig Brown was sacked in August 2004 and replaced with assistant Billy Davies whose indifferent start resulted in Etuhu being relegated to the bench as Davies preferred a centre-midfield of Brian O'Neil and Paul McKenna alongside wingers Chris Sedgwick and Eddie Lewis. As Preston's formed picked up Etuhu found himself out of the matchday squad altogether but as the side closed in on the playoffs he returned to the bench making substitute appearances in the last 7 games including the 1-0 playoff final defeat to West Ham at Cardiff.

In August 2005 Etuhu began his third season in a row in the Preston midfield but indifferent form and the signings of Adam Nowland and David Jones meant he was again reduced to substitute appearances. By December 2005 Etuhu began to consider his future away from Deepdale as he repeatedly failed to make the matchday squad and in January 2006 he signed for Norwich on loan for the rest of the 2005/06 season. With Preston failing to include a clause to prevent Etuhu playing against his parent club his first game for Norwich was strangely against the Lilywhites at Carrow Road. During the match Etuhu all but sealed the end of his career at Deepdale with a clumsy challenge that broke Preston midfielder Adam Nowland's leg, an injury that would all but end Nowland's footballing career.

Norwich City
Norwich City signed him during the January transfer window for £450,000 after a loan deal initially brought him to the club. His form began to improve towards the end of the season and in the early stages of the 2006–07 campaign.

Etuhu scored his first goal for Norwich in a 2–0 win against Torquay United in a League Cup match on 23 August 2006, and got his first league goal for the club in a 3–3 draw at Southend United on 12 September 2006. On 21 October 2006 he scored the only goal in a 1–0 win against Cardiff at Carrow Road to help his new manager Peter Grant win his first home game after replacing Nigel Worthington.

It was incorrectly reported during September 2006 that following the 3–1 defeat at Plymouth Argyle, Etuhu and teammate Youssef Safri traded punches on the team bus on their return journey to East Anglia.

Sunderland
Etuhu signed for newly promoted Sunderland in a deal worth £1.5 million in the summer of 2007. On 9 February 2008, Etuhu scored his first goal for Sunderland in their home match against Wigan. It came from a free kick floated in by Dean Whitehead, opening the scoring in the 2–0 defeat of the Latics.

Fulham

On 29 August 2008, Etuhu announced that he was having a medical with Premier League side Fulham, before joining for a fee of around £1.5 million on a three-year contract at Craven Cottage. Etuhu scored his first goal for Fulham on Easter Sunday 2009 in a game against his former club Manchester City in the 59th minute to put Fulham up 2–1 after a goal from American Clint Dempsey in the 50th minute.

He scored his first goal in European Competition, and his first goal at Craven Cottage, the week after his first son was born with a header to put Fulham 1–0 up against Lithuanian team FK Vetra. On 28 August 2010, Etuhu rescued his team in a match vs. Blackpool, by scoring in the 87th minute in a 2–2 draw at Bloomfield Road. On 18 September 2010, Etuhu played against Blackburn Rovers at Ewood Park in a 1–1 draw. In September 2010, Etuhu, signed a three-year contract extension, which will see him contracted to Craven Cottage until summer 2014. He made his 50th Premier League appearance for them against Newcastle United, in a 0–0 draw on 13 November, when he replaced Zoltan Gera, in the 69th minute in the game at St James' Park. Etuhu scored his fifth goal in Fulham colours when he netted the second in a 6–2 victory over Peterborough United on 8 January 2011 in the FA Cup 3rd round. On 5 March he started and completed the full 90 minutes in a 3–2 win over Blackburn. On 3 April, he scored on 72 minutes thanks to an assist from defender Brede Hangeland in the defeat 3–0 of Blackpool at Craven Cottage. On 9 April, he started in the 2–0 loss against Manchester United at Old Trafford before being replaced on 67 minutes by Zoltán Gera.

On 3 August 2012, Fulham announced that Etuhu had left the club to join Danny Murphy at Blackburn Rovers.

Blackburn Rovers
On 3 August 2012, Etuhu joined Blackburn Rovers on a four-year deal for an undisclosed fee. He scored his first goal for Blackburn on 29 September 2012 against Charlton Athletic.

AIK
On 23 December 2014 it was announced that he was acquired by the Swedish AIK of Allsvenskan as a free agent on a two-year deal. His first three starts came in the domestic cup 2014–15 Svenska Cupen, where he managed to get a yellow card in every game. He missed the start of the regular season with an injury.

IFK Rössjöholm
On 6 August 2017, Etuhu signed a contract with Swedish 5 division club IFK Rössjöholm.

International career
It was announced in late September 2007 that Etuhu had been called up to play for his country on 14 October. He first played in two friendlies for his country and he then made his competitive international debut in the African Cup of Nations in January 2008. Etuhu was part of the Nigeria squad for the 2010 World Cup held in South Africa. He turned down a callup in August 2011 as a replacement player and stated he would not play for Nigeria coach Samson Siasia, temporarily ending his international career. He was however recalled in November 2011 for a pair of friendlies under new coach Stephen Keshi.

Personal life
His younger brother Kelvin is also a footballer. He grew up in Peckham, south London, but then, the family moved to Manchester for Etuhu to pursue his professional ambitions with City.

Match fixing
In November 2019 he was found guilty of match fixing by a Swedish court, and said he would appeal. Both Defence and Prosecution said they would appeal the sentence.
In June 2020, Etuhu was handed a five-year ban from football in Sweden.

Honours
Fulham
UEFA Europa League: Runner-up 2009–10

Nigeria
Africa Cup of Nations third place:2010

Career statistics

Club

2011–12 appearances includes match in Uefa Cup, away to Dnipro on 25 August 2011, which is currently not included on Soccerbase website. 2015 appearances includes three matches in 2014–15 Svenska Cupen, also not included on Soccerbase.

References

External links

1982 births
Living people
Sportspeople from Kano
Black British sportsmen
English people of Nigerian descent
Association football midfielders
Nigerian footballers
Nigeria international footballers
2008 Africa Cup of Nations players
2010 Africa Cup of Nations players
Nigerian expatriate footballers
Expatriate footballers in England
Expatriate footballers in Sweden
Manchester City F.C. players
Preston North End F.C. players
Norwich City F.C. players
Sunderland A.F.C. players
Fulham F.C. players
Blackburn Rovers F.C. players
Premier League players
AIK Fotboll players
Allsvenskan players
English Football League players
2010 FIFA World Cup players
Nigerian expatriate sportspeople in England